The 2012–13 Sydney Blue Sox season was the third season for the team. As was the case for the previous season, the Blue Sox competed in the Australian Baseball League (ABL) with the other five foundation teams, and again played its home games at Blacktown International Sportspark Sydney.

Offseason

Regular season

Standings

Record vs opponents

Game log 

|- bgcolor=#bbffbb
| 1
| 2 November
| @ 
| 3–2
| T. Van Steensel
| E. Massingham
| M. Williams
| 1-0
| 
|- bgcolor=#bbffbb
| 2
| 3 November (DH 1)
| @ 
| 2–1
| V. Harris
| K. Perkins
| M. William
| 2-0
|  
|- bgcolor=#ffbbbb
| 3
| 3 November (DH 2)
| @ 
| 1–2
| D. Loggins
| C. Anderson
| S. Toler
| 2-1
| 
|- bgcolor=#bbffbb
| 4
| 9 November
| 
| 8–0
| C. Oxspring
| J. Staatz
| -
| 3-1
| 
|- bgcolor=#ffbbbb
| 5
| 10 November
| 
| 1-3
| J. Erasmus
| T. Van Steensel
| -
| 3-2
| 
|- bgcolor=#ffbbbb
| 6
| 11 November
| 
| 2–5
| C. Smith
| V. Harris
| J. Veitch
| 3-3
| 
|- bgcolor=#bbffbb
| 7
| 22 November
| 
| 1–0
| M. Williams
| B. Wise
| -
| 4-3
| 
|- bgcolor=#bbffbb
| 8
| 23 November
| 
| 4–2
| T. Atherton
| A. Claggett
| M. Williams
| 5-3
| 
|- bgcolor=#ffbbbb
| 9
| 24 November
| 
| 4–6
| S. Mitchinson
| V. Harris
| C. Lamb
| 5-4
| 
|- bgcolor=#ffbbbb
| 10
| 25 November
| 
| 3–4
| D. Schmidt
| T. Cox
| B. Wise
| 5-5
| 
|- bgcolor=#bbffbb
| 11
| 30 November
| @ 
| 8–3
| C. Oxspring
| C. Lofgren
| -
| 6-5
| 
|-

|- bgcolor=#ffbbbb
| 12
| 1 December (DH 1)
| @ 
| 2–3
| J. Erasmus
| W. Lundgren
| R. Searle
| 6-6
| 
|- bgcolor=#bbffbb
| 13
| 1 December (DH 2)
| @ 
| 3–2
| C. Anderson
| J. Erasmus
| M. Williams
| 7-6
| 
|- bgcolor=#bbffbb
| 14
| 2 December
| @ 
| 9–2
| T. Cox
| J. Staatz
| -
| 8-6
| 
|- bgcolor=#ffbbbb
| 15
| 6 December
| 
| 1–2
| E. Massingham
| T. Van Steensel
| S. Toler
| 8-7
| 
|- bgcolor=#bbffbb
| 16
| 7 December
| 
| 4–3
| C. Anderson
| R. Dickmann
| M. Williams
| 9-7
| 
|- bgcolor=#ffbbbb
| 17
| 8 December
| 
| 2–6
| C. Motta
| T. Cox
| -
| 9-8
| 
|- bgcolor=#ffbbbb
| 18
| 9 December
| 
| 6–7
| D. Loggins
| T. Van Steensel
| S. Toler
| 9-9
| 
|- bgcolor=#bbffbb
| 19
| 13 December
| @ 
| 5-2
| C. Anderson
| V. Vasquez
| M. Williams
| 10-9
| 
|- bgcolor=#ffbbbb
| 20
| 14 December (DH 1)
| @ 
| 2-10
| D. Schmidt
| T. Atherton
| -
| 10-10
| 
|- bgcolor=#bbffbb
| 21
| 14 December (DH 2)
| @ 
| 6-4
| C. Oxspring
| A. Claggett
| M. Williams
| 11-10
| 
|- bgcolor=#ffbbbb
| 22
| 15 December
| @ 
| 9-10
| G. Van Sickler
| T. Herr
| C. Lamb
| 11-11
| 
|- bgcolor=#bbffbb
| 23
| 20 December
| @ 
| 5-1
| C. Anderson
| K. Reese
| -
| 12-11
| 
|- bgcolor=#ffbbbb
| 24
| 21 December
| @ 
| 0-1
| H. Koishi
| C. Oxspring
| C. Forbes
| 12-12
| 
|- bgcolor=#bbffbb
| 25
| 22 December
| @ 
| 4-3
| T. Herr
| A. Blackley
| M. Williams
| 13-12
| 
|- bgcolor=#bbffbb
| 26
| 23 December
| @ 
| 10-8
| T. Herr
| C. Forbes
| M. Williams
| 14-12
| 
|- bgcolor=#ffbbbb
| 27
| 27 December
| 
| 7-9
| A. Kittredge
| B. Thomas
| R. Olson
| 14-13
| 
|- bgcolor=#bbffbb
| 28
| 28 December
| 
| 3-2
| C. Anderson
| J. Daniels
| M. Williams
| 15-13
| 
|- bgcolor=#bbffbb
| 29
| 29 December
| 
| 2-1
| W. Lundgren
| P. Mildren
| M. Williams
| 16-13
| 
|- bgcolor=#bbffbb
| 30
| 30 December
| 
| 4-0
| T. Herr
| A. Kittredge
| -
| 17-13
| 
|-

|- bgcolor=#ffbbbb
| 31
| 3 January
| @ 
| 3-7
| Z. Fuesser
| C. Anderson
| -
| 17-14
| 
|- bgcolor=#bbffbb
| 32
| 4 January
| @ 
| 4-3
| T. Van Steensel
| R. Brown
| M. Williams
| 18-14
| 
|- bgcolor=#ffbbbb
| 33
| 5 January
| @ 
| 4-9
| P. Mildren
| B. Thomas
| -
| 18-15
| 
|- bgcolor=#ffbbbb
| 34
| 6 January
| @ 
| 6-7
| R. Olson
| D. Koo
| -
| 18-16
| 
|- bgcolor=#bbffbb
| 35
| 10 January
| 
| 13-3
| C. Oxspring
| M. Hodge
| -
| 19-16
| 
|- bgcolor=#bbffbb
| 36
| 11 January
| 
| 2-0
| C. Anderson
| J. Hussey
| M. Williams
| 20-16
| 
|- bgcolor=#bbffbb
| 37
| 12 January
| 
| 5-4
| B. Thomas
| A. Bright
| M. Williams
| 21-16
| 
|- bgcolor=#bbffbb
| 38
| 13 January
| 
| 4-1
| T. Atherton
| A. Blackley
| M. Williams
| 22-16
| 
|- bgcolor=#bbffbb
| 39
| 17 January
| @ 
| 12-8
| C. Anderson
| B. Grening
| -
| 23-16
| 
|- bgcolor=#ffbbbb
| 40
| 18 January
| @ 
| 7-8
| S. Toler
| D. Koo
| -
| 23-17
| 
|- bgcolor=#bbffbb
| 41
| 19 January
| @ 
| 10-2
| B. Thomas
| C. Motta
| -
| 24-17
| 
|- bgcolor=#ffbbbb
| 42
| 20 January
| @ 
| 3-4
| D. Loggins
| T. Herr
| -
| 24-18
| 
|- bgcolor=#bbffbb
| 43
| 24 January
| 
| 6-2
| C. Anderson
| C. Lofgren
| -
| 25-18
| 
|- bgcolor=#bbffbb
| 44
| 25 January
| 
| 13-0
| B. Thomas
| R. Searle
| -
| 26-18
| 
|- bgcolor=#ffbbbb
| 45
| 26 January
| 
| 2-4
| J. Schult
| C. Oxspring
| J. Erasmus
| 26-19
| 
|- bgcolor=#bbbbbb
| 46
| 27 January
| 
| PPD - RAIN
| -
| -
| -
| -
| 
|-

Roster

References 

Sydney Blue Sox
Sydney Blue Sox